Mostafa Mohamed (born August 18, 1985) is an amateur Egyptian Greco-Roman wrestler, who played for the men's featherweight category. Mostafa represented Egypt at the 2008 Summer Olympics in Beijing, where he competed for the men's 55 kg class. He received a bye for the preliminary round of sixteen match, before losing out to Azerbaijan's Rovshan Bayramov, with a technical score of 0–12. Because his opponent advanced further into the final match, Mohamed offered another shot for the bronze medal by entering the repechage bouts. He was defeated in the first round by Cuba's Yagnier Hernández, who was able to score nine points in two straight periods, leaving Mohamed with a single point.

References

External links
Profile – International Wrestling Database
NBC 2008 Olympics profile

1985 births
Living people
Olympic wrestlers of Egypt
Wrestlers at the 2008 Summer Olympics
Egyptian male sport wrestlers
Mediterranean Games silver medalists for Egypt
Competitors at the 2009 Mediterranean Games
Mediterranean Games medalists in wrestling
African Wrestling Championships medalists
20th-century Egyptian people
21st-century Egyptian people